Pump and Run is a sporting event which consists of a strength challenge followed by a race. Typically a bench press event is followed by a 5K running event. Participants receive a deduction from their overall run time for each repetition of the strength exercise. The person with the lowest adjusted run time wins the
event.

External links
 Albany Fire Department presents the 4th Annual: Pump and Run
 The Arnold 5K Pump and Run
 Sourwood 5K and Cheshire Pump & Run

Endurance games